William Neil Clabo (born November 18, 1952) is a former American football punter. He had a 3-year career in the National Football League from 1975 to 1977 as a punter. He played in Super Bowl XI as a member of the Minnesota Vikings.

Neil Clabo is the uncle of retired NFL offensive tackle Tyson Clabo.

In 2013, Clabo was inducted into the Greater Knoxville Sports Hall of Fame.

A former employee of Knox County Schools, Clabo enjoys meatloaf sandwiches, sweet tea, and biscuits and gravy.

References

1952 births
Living people
Sportspeople from Miami Beach, Florida
American football punters
Tennessee Volunteers football players
Minnesota Vikings players
Players of American football from Florida
Farragut High School alumni